The Reading Railers were a team of the Premier Basketball League that began play in 2007.  They played their home games at the Sovereign Center.  The team was originally going to play in the American Basketball Association.

The Railers chose not to compete in the 2008-2009 PBL season.

The Railers did not come back for the 2009-2010 season and are regarded as defunct.

References

External links
Official Website
News story announcing name, venue
News story announcing PBL affiliation

Former Premier Basketball League teams
Sports in Reading, Pennsylvania
Basketball teams in Pennsylvania
Basketball teams established in 2006
2006 establishments in Pennsylvania
Sports clubs disestablished in 2008
2008 disestablishments in Pennsylvania